Bertoldo Batawang Jr. (born October 26, 1971 in Cebu City, Cebu, Philippines), more commonly known as Bert Batawang, is a Filipino professional boxer.

Boxing career

Early career
Batawang began his professional career in 1990, winning against Lolong Quiban by a first-round technical knockout. Batawang suffered multiple losses early in his career, and in 1995, he temporarily retired from the sport after losing a ten-round decision to future WBC Light Flyweight World Champion, Yo-Sam Choi (7-0) of South Korea.

After five years away from the sport, Batawang made his ring return in 2000, fighting against unheralded Randy Narbay, whom he defeated by knockout (KO) in six rounds. He later went on to win the Philippines Boxing Federation (PBF) Light Flyweight title one year later, defeating Flash Villacura who held the title at the time. Two bouts later, Batawang lost a 12-round decision to future IBF Minimumweight World Champion, Muhammad Rachman of Indonesia. After losing to Rachman, Batawang defended his PBF Light Flyweight title a total of five times before winning the Philippines Games & Amusement Board (GAB) version of the title, after a failed bid against Wyndel Janiola.

A year later, he vied for the OPBF Light Flyweight title, then held by Shingo Yamaguchi of Japan. Batawang lost the fight by split decision (SD), by scores of 117-113, 116-113 for Yamaguchi, and a scorecard of 115-113 for Batawang. Following this bout, Batawang managed to defeat Sithembile Kibiti of South Africa, winning the fight by KO in seven rounds, and also winning the then vacant WBA Pan African Light Flyweight title.

First World Title shot
After winning eight of his next nine fights, Batawang vied for his first world title against the then IBF Light Flyweight World Champion, Ulises Solís of Mexico. On December 15, 2007, in Guadalajara, Jalisco, Mexico, Batawang failed in his bid for the IBF crown, losing to Solís by technical knockout (TKO) in the ninth round of the bout. The champion dismantled Batawang since the start of the fight, until the referee finally stopped the fight. "Batawang would later say after the fight that he was hit by Solis with a hard left over his right rib cage in the 5th round that practically immobilized him in the remainder of the contest".

Is there anything left?
Batawang won his next three fights after suffering the huge setback against Solís, also winning the then vacant WBO Oriental Light Flyweight title in the process after defeating Samransak Singmanassak of Thailand. In his first defense of the WBO Oriental title, he lost to fellow Filipino, Edren Dapudong by TKO in seven rounds. After losing to Dapudong, Batawang traveled to Linyi, China, fighting Jack Amisa of Indonesia. "The Ninja" used his stealth and wit to defeat the Indonesian by knockout in the fifth round of the bout, winning the then vacant WBO Asia Pacific Light Flyweight title.

He fought Ulises Solis on March 27, 2010 for the IBF Light Flyweight Title Eliminator. The fight was held at the Plaza Pueblo Antiguo in Mexico. The winner of the rematch between Batawang and Solis, which was originally scheduled for March 6, will become the mandatory challenger for IBF light flyweight titlist Carlos Tamara, who defeated former champion Brian Viloria in January by TKO.

In the first three rounds the bout was fairly even. However, in the next rounds, Solis’ power and Batawang’s age began to tell: Batawang was floored in the 4th round and the Mexican fighter hammered him during the 5th round. The Filipino veteran boxer remained on his stool and was forced to retire at the beginning of the sixth round.

With the win Solis improved to 30-2-2 with 21 knockouts while Batawang dropped to 45-15-3 with 17 knockouts.

References

External links 

1971 births
Light-flyweight boxers
Living people
Sportspeople from Cebu City
Boxers from Cebu
Southpaw boxers
Filipino male boxers